Live at the Village Vanguard is a live album recorded by American jazz bassist Christian McBride with his band Inside Straight. This is McBride's twelfth release with Mack Avenue Music Group.

Background
McBride and his group Inside Straight of saxophonist Steve Wilson, pianists Eric Reed and Peter Martin, vibraphonist Warren Wolf, and drummer Carl Allen, have performed annually at the New York jazz club Village Vanguard starting from 2007 and been interrupted only by the lockdown as a result of the COVID-19 pandemic. McBride has recorded two studio albums with Inside Straight, Kind of Brown in 2009 and People Music in 2013; by this time Peter Martin had taken over the pianist position from Reed. Recorded in December 2014, the present album contains seven tracks including versions of three tracks from each of their previous studio albums and a new track, "Sweet Bread". The album should not be confused with McBride's album of the same name, Live at the Village Vanguard, that he and his trio (featuring Christian Sands and Ulysses Owens, Jr.) recorded at the same venue a week earlier and released via Mack Avenue in 2015.

Reception
Brian Pristley of Jazzwise wrote, "The excitement of the performance communicates to the audience (and vice versa), while the intensity of the mostly long tracks ensures that you don’t notice the length." Mike Jurkovic of All About Jazz noted, "McBride needs no further introduction save to say he has heightened fun into an art form. His playing, even at its most pensive and persuasive, proclaims that better times are here even if just for the immediate moment. The immediate gig. This immediate assemblage of keen minded, high flying musicians. And this is their last set of the three-night stand so they'd like to play for you now." Matt Collar of AllMusic commented, "Of course, pulling all of this together is McBride, whose robust and sinewy basslines remain as impressive as ever." David Whiteis of the Jazz Journal added, "McBride, as always, is strong-fingered and nimble, attaining a remarkable variety of tonal colorations while maintaining his rhythmic sureness even as he bends, twists, and contorts the tunes’ metric structures to his own ends: a paradigm of unforced, unselfconscious virtuosity."

Track listing

Personnel
Christian McBride – bass
Steve Wilson – alto saxophone, soprano saxophone
Carl Allen – drums
Peter Martin – piano
Warren Wolf – vibraphone

References

External links 
 Christian McBride Discography

2021 live albums
Christian McBride albums
Mack Avenue Records albums
Albums recorded at the Village Vanguard